Rico Glagla is a paralympic athlete from Germany competing mainly in category F52 shot put events.

Biography
Glagla competed in the 2004 Summer Paralympics, winning silver in the F52 discus, a bronze in the shot put and finished seventh in the javelin.

References

Paralympic athletes of Germany
Athletes (track and field) at the 2004 Summer Paralympics
Paralympic silver medalists for Germany
Paralympic bronze medalists for Germany
Living people
Medalists at the 2004 Summer Paralympics
Year of birth missing (living people)
Paralympic medalists in athletics (track and field)
German male discus throwers
German male shot putters